Ei Ei Thet (born 13 December 1992) is a Burmese swimmer. She competed in the women's 50 metre freestyle event at the 2016 Summer Olympics, where she ranked 70th with a time of 30.25 seconds. She did not advance to the semifinals.

References

External links
 

1992 births
Living people
Burmese female swimmers
Olympic swimmers of Myanmar
Swimmers at the 2016 Summer Olympics
Place of birth missing (living people)